Cholsey is a village and civil parish  south of Wallingford in South Oxfordshire. In 1974 it was transferred from Berkshire to Oxfordshire, and from Wallingford Rural District to the district of South Oxfordshire. The 2011 Census recorded Cholsey's parish population as 3,457. The village green is called "The Forty" and has a substantial and ancient walnut tree. 

Winterbrook was historically at the north end of the parish adjoining Wallingford and became part of Wallingford parish (run by its Town Council) in 2015. Winterbrook Bridge, which carries a by-pass road across the River Thames, is in the parish. Cholsey was one of the two main homes of the late author Dame Agatha Christie (the other being the village of Galmpton on the south Devon coast). John Masefield, poet laureate, lived at Lollingdon Farm in Cholsey from 1915 to 1917.

History
A Bronze Age site has been found beside the River Thames at Whitecross Farm in the northeast of the parish. A pre-Roman road, the Icknield Way, crosses the River Thames at Cholsey. A find announced in 2017 was of a substantial Roman site in Celsea Place. Archaeologists discovered the best examples of corn dryers they have seen, with precision suggesting they were built by an engineer. Sites of burials and cremation pots have also been found. There is also part of a Roman villa, the majority of which appeared to have extended out under the existing road and houses and will have suffered significant unrecorded damage. The section of villa remaining within the archaeologically excavated area has been preserved in situ. 

The village itself was founded on an island ("Ceol's Isle") in marshy ground close to the Thames. There is evidence that the House of Wessex royal family owned land in Cholsey in the 6th and 7th centuries. At this time the town was home to a Saint Wilgyth who was venerated locally in the Middle Ages. A royal nunnery, Cholsey Abbey, was founded in the village in 986 by Queen Dowager Ælfthryth on land given by her son, King Æthelred the Unready. The nunnery is thought to have been destroyed by invading Vikings in 1006 when they camped in Cholsey after setting nearby Wallingford ablaze. 

However, Saxon masonry still survives in the Church of England parish church of St Mary. Most of this flint and stone church was built in the 12th century. The church is cruciform. Additions were made to it in the 13th and 14th centuries. In the 13th-century a tithe barn was built in the village. It was demolished in 1815. Fair Mile Hospital, a former psychiatric hospital, opened near Cholsey in 1870 and closed in 2003. In 2011–14 its Victorian buildings were converted to homes and new housing was built in its grounds.

Transport

Cholsey is served by Cholsey railway station, a calling point for Great Western Railway stopping services on the Great Western Main Line between Reading and Didcot. From Mondays to Saturdays Thames Travel bus route 136 links Cholsey with Wallingford and Benson. There is no evening, Sunday or bank holiday service.

Architecture and buildings
Writer and poet John Masefield lived in the parish for several years during World War I as tenant of Lollingdon Farm at the foot of the Berkshire Downs. He was Poet Laureate from 1936 to his death in 1967 and wrote a series of poems and sonnets called Lollingdon Downs and his poem Sea-Fever, which has been set to music by John Ireland. The farmhouse, on Westfield Road, has been listed grade II since 1986.

Edward Prioleau Warren (1856–1937), lived at Breach House, in Halfpenny Lane, Cholsey, built in 1906, which he designed for himself. The building is grade II listed.

St Mary's churchyard
The grave of novelist Dame Agatha Christie is in the churchyard of St Mary's. She lived with her second husband, archaeologist Sir Max Mallowan, at Winterbrook House, formerly in the north of the parish, from about 1934 and died there in 1976. She and her husband had chosen a burial plot in the mid-1960s just under the perimeter wall of the churchyard. About twenty journalists and TV reporters attended her funeral service, some having travelled from as far away as South America. Thirty wreaths adorned her grave including one from the cast of her long-running play The Mousetrap, and another sent "on behalf of the multitude of grateful readers" from the Ulverscroft Large Print Book Publishers.

References

Sources

External links

Cholsey Parish Council website
Royal Berkshire History: Cholsey

Villages in Oxfordshire
Civil parishes in Oxfordshire